Hanson Ridge is a prominent ice-free ridge situated  northwest of Spike Cape, near the center of Wilson Piedmont Glacier in Victoria Land, Antarctica. The feature was marked as "Black Ridge" on maps of the British Antarctic Expedition under Robert Falcon Scott, 1910–13, but there is already a Black Ridge in Victoria Land. In order to avoid identical names it was renamed in 1964 by the Advisory Committee on Antarctic Names for Kirby J. Hanson, a meteorologist at the South Pole Station, 1958.

References

Ridges of Victoria Land
Scott Coast